Faávae Kololo is a  former Samoa international rugby league footballer.

Playing career
Kololo was contracted to the Auckland Warriors in 2000 but suffered a knee injury and did not play a first grade match.

Kololo played for Samoa in the 2000 World Cup.

From the Richmond Bulldogs, in 2001 he played for the Marist Richmond Brothers in the Bartercard Cup.

References

Living people
Samoa national rugby league team players
Richmond Bulldogs players
Marist Richmond Brothers players
New Zealand sportspeople of Samoan descent
New Zealand rugby league players
Rugby league props
Rugby league second-rows
1972 births